The 1983–84 New Jersey Nets season was the Nets' eighth season in the NBA, and saw the franchise win its first NBA playoff series, although this would remain the Nets' only playoff series win until 2002.

Draft picks

Roster

Regular season

Season standings

z – clinched division title
y – clinched division title
x – clinched playoff spot

Record vs. opponents

Game log

Regular season

|- align="center" bgcolor="#ccffcc"
| 7
| November 11, 1983
| Milwaukee
| W 107–103
|
|
|
| Brendan Byrne Arena
| 5–2
|- align="center" bgcolor="#ffcccc"
| 10
| November 17, 1983
| @ Dallas
| L 113–115
|
|
|
| Reunion Arena
| 6–4
|- align="center" bgcolor="#ccffcc"
| 12
| November 23, 1983
| @ Phoenix
| W 110–108
|
|
|
| Arizona Veterans Memorial Coliseum
| 7–5
|- align="center" bgcolor="#ffcccc"
| 13
| November 25, 1983
| @ Los Angeles
| L 123–147
|
|
|
| The Forum
| 7–6
|- align="center" bgcolor="#ffcccc"
| 15
| November 30, 1983
| New York
| L 104–113
|
|
|
| Brendan Byrne Arena
| 8–7

|- align="center" bgcolor="#ffcccc"
| 16
| December 2, 1983
| @ Milwaukee
| L 107–122
|
|
|
| MECCA Arena
| 8–8
|- align="center" bgcolor="#ccffcc"
| 26
| December 22, 1983
| Dallas
| W 101–98
|
|
|
| Brendan Byrne Arena
| 13–13
|- align="center" bgcolor="#ffcccc"
| 27
| December 23, 1983
| @ Boston
| L 113–125
|
|
|
| Boston Garden
| 13–14
|- align="center" bgcolor="#ffcccc"
| 28
| December 25, 1983
| @ New York
| L 110–112 (OT)
|
|
|
| Madison Square Garden
| 13–15
|- align="center" bgcolor="#ffcccc"
| 30
| December 28, 1983
| Milwaukee
| L 85–89
|
|
|
| Brendan Byrne Arena
| 13–17

|- align="center" bgcolor="#ffcccc"
| 32
| January 3, 1984
| Boston
| L 103–105
|
|
|
| Brendan Byrne Arena
| 14–18
|- align="center" bgcolor="#ccffcc"
| 40
| January 17, 1984
| @ New York
| W 121–115
|
|
|
| Madison Square Garden
| 20–20
|- align="center" bgcolor="#ffcccc"
| 44
| January 26, 1984
| @ Utah
| L 115–125
|
|
|
| Salt Palace Acord Arena
| 22–22
|- align="center"
|colspan="9" bgcolor="#bbcaff"|All-Star Break
|- style="background:#cfc;"
|- bgcolor="#bbffbb"

|- align="center" bgcolor="#ccffcc"
| 48
| February 6, 1984
| Boston
| W 115–112
|
|
|
| Brendan Byrne Arena
| 25–23
|- align="center" bgcolor="#ffcccc"
| 55
| February 18, 1984
| @ New York
| L 102–112
|
|
|
| Madison Square Garden
| 26–29
|- align="center" bgcolor="#ccffcc"
| 58
| February 25, 1984
| New York
| W 117–104
|
|
|
| Brendan Byrne Arena
| 29–29
|- align="center" bgcolor="#ccffcc"
| 59
| February 29, 1984
| Los Angeles
| W 102–92
|
|
|
| Brendan Byrne Arena
| 30–29

|- align="center" bgcolor="#ccffcc"
| 61
| March 5, 1984
| Utah
| W 120–116
|
|
|
| Brendan Byrne Arena
| 32–29
|- align="center" bgcolor="#ccffcc"
| 62
| March 7, 1984
| @ Milwaukee
| W 106–100
|
|
|
| MECCA Arena
| 33–29
|- align="center" bgcolor="#ccffcc"
| 65
| March 14, 1984
| Phoenix
| W 108–102
|
|
|
| Brendan Byrne Arena
| 35–30
|- align="center" bgcolor="#ffcccc"
| 69
| March 21, 1984
| Milwaukee
| L 95–102
|
|
|
| Brendan Byrne Arena
| 37–32
|- align="center" bgcolor="#ccffcc"
| 70
| March 23, 1984
| @ Boston
| W 101–97
|
|
|
| Boston Garden
| 38–32
|- align="center" bgcolor="#ccffcc"
| 71
| March 25, 1984
| New York
| W 107–94
|
|
|
| Brendan Byrne Arena
| 39–32
|- align="center" bgcolor="#ffcccc"
| 74
| March 31, 1984
| Boston
| L 98–107
|
|
|
| Brendan Byrne Arena
| 40–34

|- align="center" bgcolor="#ffcccc"
| 75
| April 3, 1984
| @ Milwaukee
| L 92–109
|
|
|
| MECCA Arena
| 40–35
|- align="center" bgcolor="#ffcccc"
| 82
| April 15, 1984
| @ Boston
| L 111–118
|
|
|
| Boston Garden
| 45–37

Playoffs

|- align="center" bgcolor="#ccffcc"
| 1
| April 18
| @ Philadelphia
| W 116–101
| Buck Williams (25)
| Buck Williams (16)
| Micheal Ray Richardson (9)
| Spectrum12,511
| 1–0
|- align="center" bgcolor="#ccffcc"
| 2
| April 20
| @ Philadelphia
| W 116–102
| Micheal Ray Richardson (32)
| Buck Williams (9)
| Micheal Ray Richardson (9)
| Spectrum14,025
| 2–0
|- align="center" bgcolor="#ffcccc"
| 3
| April 22
| Philadelphia
| L 100–108
| Buck Williams (21)
| Buck Williams (17)
| Micheal Ray Richardson (11)
| Brendan Byrne Arena12,399
| 2–1
|- align="center" bgcolor="#ffcccc"
| 4
| April 24
| Philadelphia
| L 102–110
| Albert King (20)
| Buck Williams (18)
| Micheal Ray Richardson (9)
| Brendan Byrne Arena20,149
| 2–2
|- align="center" bgcolor="#ccffcc"
| 5
| April 26
| @ Philadelphia
| W 101–98
| Richardson, Birdsong (24)
| Buck Williams (16)
| Richardson, Birdsong (6)
| Spectrum17,921
| 3–2
|-

|- align="center" bgcolor="#ccffcc"
| 1
| April 29, 1984
| @ Milwaukee
| W 106–100
| Darryl Dawkins (32)
| Buck Williams (17)
| Micheal Ray Richardson (8)
| MECCA Arena11,052
| 1–0
|- align="center" bgcolor="#ffcccc"
| 2
| May 1, 1984
| @ Milwaukee
| L 94–98
| Buck Williams (21)
| Buck Williams (18)
| Williams, Richardson (5)
| MECCA Arena11,052
| 1–1
|- align="center" bgcolor="#ffcccc"
| 3
| May 3, 1984
| Milwaukee
| L 93–100
| Darryl Dawkins (31)
| Buck Williams (14)
| Richardson, Cook (6)
| Brendan Byrne Arena15,868
| 1–2
|- align="center" bgcolor="#ccffcc"
| 4
| May 5, 1984
| Milwaukee
| W 106–99
| Micheal Ray Richardson (24)
| Buck Williams (10)
| Otis Birdsong (7)
| Brendan Byrne Arena14,623
| 2–2
|- align="center" bgcolor="#ffcccc"
| 5
| May 8, 1984
| @ Milwaukee
| L 82–94
| Darryl Dawkins (20)
| Williams, Dawkins (8)
| Micheal Ray Richardson (6)
| MECCA Arena11,052
| 2–3
|- align="center" bgcolor="#ffcccc"
| 6
| May 10, 1984
| Milwaukee
| L 97–98
| Darryl Dawkins (29)
| Buck Williams (12)
| Micheal Ray Richardson (9)
| Brendan Byrne Arena15,283
| 2–4
|-

Player statistics

Season

Playoffs

Awards and records

Transactions

References

See also
 1983–84 NBA season

New Jersey Nets season
New Jersey Nets seasons
New Jersey Nets
New Jersey Nets
20th century in East Rutherford, New Jersey
Meadowlands Sports Complex